Similosodus unifasciatus is a species of beetle in the family Cerambycidae. It was described by Maurice Pic in 1934, originally under the genus Sodus.

References

unifasciatus
Beetles described in 1934